Pedro Vitor de Sousa Neto Silva (born 14 February 1998), commonly known as Pedro Vitor, is a Brazilian footballer who currently plays as a midfielder for Tupi.

Career statistics

Club

Notes

References

1998 births
Living people
Brazilian footballers
Association football midfielders
São Paulo FC players
Sociedade Esportiva Palmeiras players
Goiás Esporte Clube players
Tupi Football Club players